Phirphire is a 2016 novel by Nepalese writer Buddhi Sagar. It is published by FinePrint Publication. It was launched on 23 January 2016 in Kathmandu, Nepal. Phirphire is the second novel of Buddhi Sagar.

Reception 
In 2016, Phirphire was nominated for Madan Puraskar, Nepal's highest literary honour, however, it lost to Ramlal Joshi's Aina.

See also 

 Karnali Blues
 Seto Dharti
 Aina

References

Further reading 

 
 

21st-century Nepalese novels
Nepalese novels
Novels set in Nepal
Nepalese books
Nepali-language novels
2016 Nepalese novels